Jim Hoffman is a conspiracy theorist from Oakland, California, who created several web sites about the September 11, 2001 attacks that analyze and suggest alternative accounts for the events of that day. His primary website, 9-11 Research, serves as an archive of documentation and alternative analyses about the attacks.  Hoffman has also written numerous technical essays which focus on the World Trade Center controlled demolition hypothesis.

In 2006, the Editor of Popular Mechanics, James B. Meigs, described Hoffman as a "leading conspiracy theorist."

Background
Hoffman co-published a paper on "Computer graphics tools for the study of minimal surfaces".

Causes

Justice For Woody
Hoffman was part of a citizens group that protested the killing by police of Robert "Woody" Woodward, in December 2001, after Woodward entered a church in Brattleboro, Vermont, seeking asylum from the CIA. Hoffman created the website www.justiceforwoody.org, which is now defunct and its contents moved to justiceforwoody.wtc7.net.

September 11, 2001 attacks
Since early 2003, Hoffman has been writing about the collapse of the World Trade Center (WTC) and other aspects of the September 11, 2001 attacks. His work has examined the collapse of the smaller 7 World Trade Center, and he is critical of the official explanation of that collapse. Hoffman has also written a critique of the official National Institute of Standards and Technology (NIST) report on the building collapses, a critique of the 2006 NIST FAQ, and critiques of articles about the 9/11 conspiracy theories by the popular-science magazines Scientific American and Popular Mechanics.

See also
 9/11 Truth Movement
 9/11 conspiracy theories
 World Trade Center controlled demolition conspiracy theories

References

Publications
 
 
 
Hoffman, Jim and Paul, Don. "Waking up from our Nightmare: The 9/11 Crimes in New York City"

External links
 official website

American male writers
Geometers
Living people
9/11 conspiracy theorists
American conspiracy theorists
Year of birth missing (living people)